The 2000 Grand Prix Hassan II was an Association of Tennis Professionals men's tennis tournament held in Casablanca, Morocco. It was the 16th edition of the tournament and was held from 10 April until 17 April 2000. Fernando Vicente won the singles title.

Finals

Singles

 Fernando Vicente defeated  Sébastien Grosjean 6–4, 4–6, 7–6(7–3)
 It was Vicente's only title of the year and the 2nd of his career.

Doubles

 Arnaud Clément /  Sébastien Grosjean defeated  Lars Burgsmüller /  Andrew Painter 7–6(7–4), 6–4
 It was Clément's 1st title of the year and the 1st of his career. It was Grosjean's 1st title of the year and the 1st of his career.

References

External links
 ATP tournament profile

 
Grand Prix Hassan II
Grand Prix Hassan II
Grand Prix Hassan II